Consort Han may refer to:

Consort Han (Later Tang) (died after 936), consort of Li Cunxu (Emperor Zhuangzong of Later Tang)
Empress Han (1165–1200), wife of Emperor Ningzong of Song
Queen Sunjeong (died 1374?), wife of Gongmin of Goryeo
Royal Consort Ik-Bi (died after 1390), wife of Gongmin of Goryeo
Consort Han (Yongle) (died 1424), concubine of the Yongle Emperor
Queen Jangsun (1445–1462), wife of Yejong of Joseon
Queen Ansun (1445–1499), wife of Yejong of Joseon
Queen Gonghye (1456–1474), wife of Seongjong of Joseon
Queen Inyeol (1594–1636), wife of Injo of Joseon

See also
Queen Sinui (1337–1391), mother of Jeongjong and Taejong of Joseon, posthumously honored as a queen
Queen Insu (1437–1504), mother of Seongjong of Joseon, posthumously honored as a queen